Derek (Dereck) Nash was an American soccer player who earned one cap with the U.S. national team in a 3-2 loss to Iceland on August 25, 1955.

American soccer players
United States men's international soccer players
Possibly living people
Year of birth missing

Association footballers not categorized by position